Brezik may refer to several places in Bosnia and Herzegovina:

 Brezik (Brčko)
 Brezik, Kalesija
 Brezik (Srebrenik)
 Brezik, Vareš

See also
 Brezik Našički, Croatia